David Buxo (born 16 June 1981) is an Andorran football player. He has played for Andorra national team.

National team statistics

References

1981 births
Living people
Andorran footballers
Association football midfielders
Andorra international footballers